Lithuania participated in the Eurovision Song Contest 2005 with the song "Little by Little" written by Bobby Ljunggren and William "Billy" Butt. The song was performed by Laura and the Lovers. The Lithuanian broadcaster Lithuanian National Radio and Television (LRT) organised the national final "Eurovizijos" dainų konkurso nacionalinė atranka (Eurovision Song Contest national selection) in order to select the Lithuanian entry for the 2005 contest in Kyiv, Ukraine. The national final took place over eight weeks and involved 49 competing entries. The results of each show were determined entirely by a public vote. In the final, twenty entries remained and "Little by Little" performed by Laura and the Lovers was selected as the winner with 5,465 votes.

Lithuania competed in the semi-final of the Eurovision Song Contest which took place on 19 May 2005. Performing during the show in position 2, "Little by Little" was not announced among the top 10 entries of the semi-final and therefore did not qualify to compete in the final. It was later revealed that Lithuania placed twenty-fifth (last) out of the 25 participating countries in the semi-final with 17 points.

Background 

Prior to the 2005 contest, Lithuania had participated in the Eurovision Song Contest five times since its first entry in 1994. The nation’s best placing in the contest was thirteenth, which it achieved in 2001 with the song "You Got Style" performed by Skamp. In the 2004 contest, "What's Happened to Your Love?" performed by Linas and Simona failed to qualify to the final.
 
For the 2005 contest, the Lithuanian national broadcaster, Lithuanian National Radio and Television (LRT), broadcast the event within Lithuania and organised the selection process for the nation's entry. Other than the internal selection of their debut entry in 1994, Lithuania has selected their entry consistently through a national final procedure. LRT confirmed their intentions to participate at the 2005 Eurovision Song Contest on 4 November 2004 and announced the organization of "Eurovizijos" dainų konkurso nacionalinė atranka, which would be the national final to select Lithuania's entry for Kyiv.

Before Eurovision

"Eurovizijos" dainų konkurso nacionalinė atranka 
"Eurovizijos" dainų konkurso nacionalinė atranka (Eurovision Song Contest national selection) was the national final format developed by LRT in order to select Lithuania's entry for the Eurovision Song Contest 2005. The competition involved an eight-week-long process that commenced on 8 January 2005 and concluded with a winning song and artist on 26 February 2005. The eight shows were hosted by Jurga Šeduikytė and Rolandas Vilkončius and were broadcast on LTV and LTV2 as well as online via the broadcaster's website lrt.lt.

Format 
The 2005 competition involved 49 entries and consisted of eight shows. The first seven shows were the semi-finals held during the programme Lietuvos dainų dešimtukas. Six to eight entries participated in each semi-final resulting in the top two or three that proceeded to the final. Three entries advanced if the semi-final had more than six entries, while two entries advanced if the semi-final had six or less entries. LRT also selected a wildcard act for the final out of the remaining non-qualifying acts from the semi-finals. In the final, the winner was selected from the remaining twenty entries. The results of each of the eight shows were determined solely by public televoting through telephone and SMS voting.

Competing entries 
LRT opened a submission period on 4 November 2004 for artists and songwriters to submit their entries with the deadline on 10 December 2004. On 13 January 2005, LRT announced the 54 entries selected for the competition from 60 submissions received. The final changes to the list of 54 competing acts were later made with the withdrawal of the songs "Who You Are" performed by Diana, "Veins" performed by No Hero, "When the Night Comes" performed by Smoggaz and "Gloria" performed by Ubalda as well as the disqualification of "You" performed by Justė Kriauzaitė due to the song being a remake of "Ben" by Michael Jackson.

Shows

Semi-finals 
The seven semi-finals of the competition took place at the LRT studios in Vilnius between 8 January and 19 February 2005 and featured the 49 competing entries. In each of the first to fourth and sixth semi-finals the top three advanced to the final, while the top two entries of the fifth and seventh semi-finals advanced to the final. On 22 February 2005, LRT announced that "Now You Know" performed by Reda Striškaitė had received the wildcard and also proceeded to the final.

Final 
The final of the competition took place on 26 February 2005 at the Kaunas Sports Hall in Kaunas and featured the remaining twenty entries that qualified from the semi-final. "Little by Little" performed by Laura and the Lovers was selected as the winner after gaining the most votes from the public. In addition to the performances of the competing entries, 2001 Lithuanian Eurovision entrants Skamp and 2002 Latvian Eurovision winner Marie N performed as the interval acts.

At Eurovision
According to Eurovision rules, all nations with the exceptions of the host country, the "Big Four" (France, Germany, Spain and the United Kingdom), and the ten highest placed finishers in the 2004 contest are required to qualify from the semi-final on 19 May 2005 in order to compete for the final on 21 May 2005; the top ten countries from the semi-final progress to the final. On 22 March 2005, a special allocation draw was held which determined the running order for the semi-final and Lithuania was set to perform in position 2, following the entry from Austria and before the entry from Portugal. At the end of the semi-final, Lithuania was not announced among the top 10 entries and therefore failed to qualify to compete in the final. It was later revealed that Lithuania placed twenty-fifth (last) in the semi-final, receiving a total of 17 points.

The semi-final and final were broadcast in Lithuania on LTV with commentary by Darius Užkuraitis. The Lithuanian spokesperson, who announced the Lithuanian votes during the final, was Rolandas Vilkončius.

Voting 
Below is a breakdown of points awarded to Lithuania and awarded by Lithuania in the semi-final and grand final of the contest. The nation awarded its 12 points to Latvia in the semi-final and the final of the contest.

Points awarded to Lithuania

Points awarded by Lithuania

References

2005
Countries in the Eurovision Song Contest 2005
Eurovision